Claudia Meucci (born 22 January 1999) is an Italian professional racing cyclist. She signed to ride for the UCI Women's Team  for the 2019 women's road cycling season.

References

External links
 

1999 births
Living people
Italian female cyclists
Place of birth missing (living people)
People from Scandicci
Cyclists from Tuscany
Sportspeople from the Metropolitan City of Florence